Aleksei Igorevich Orlov (born 24 March 1997) is a Russian football player. He plays for FC SKA-Khabarovsk.

Club career
He made his debut in the Russian Professional Football League for FC Irtysh Omsk on 10 August 2016 in a game against FC Dynamo Barnaul.

He made his Russian Football National League debut for FC Sibir Novosibirsk on 3 March 2019 in a game against FC Tyumen.

References

External links
 
 Profile by Russian Professional Football League

1997 births
Sportspeople from Omsk
Living people
Russian footballers
Association football midfielders
FC Irtysh Omsk players
FC Amkar Perm players
FC Krasnodar players
FC Sibir Novosibirsk players
FC SKA-Khabarovsk players
FC Sokol Saratov players
Russian First League players
Russian Second League players